The M-28 or M-29 Davy Crockett Weapon System was a tactical nuclear recoilless smoothbore gun for firing the M388 nuclear projectile, armed with the W54 nuclear warhead, that was deployed by the United States during the Cold War. It was the first project assigned to the United States Army Weapon Command in Rock Island, Illinois.
It is named after American folk hero, soldier, and congressman Davy Crockett.

History
By the year 1950, there had been rapid developments made in the use of nuclear weapons after the detonation of "Little Boy" and "Fat Man" in 1945. These developments paved the way for nuclear warheads to be created at a smaller size. 

By the 1950s, advances in nuclear weapons technology, spurred on by the first detonation of the Soviet nuclear bomb in 1949, led to great reductions in the size of nuclear weapons. By 1957, the Atomic Energy Commission (AEC) declared that it had created a small fission warhead that could be deployed for frontline use by infantrymen. AEC made Major General John H. Hinrichs the leader in turning the warhead into a weapon system under the Battle Group Atomic Delivery System (BGADS) program, which began at Picatinny Arsenal in New Jersey in January 1958.

In August 1958, the Army began to officially refer to the BGADS as the Davy Crockett, after the American folk hero, who died at the Battle of the Alamo in 1836. After 4 years of testing at Forts Greeley and Wainwright in Alaska, and the Yuma Test Station in Arizona, the M28/M29 Davy Crockett entered service in May 1961.

Davy Crockett sections were assigned to United States Army Europe which included Seventh United States Army, and to Pacific Theater Eighth United States Army armor units and mechanized and non-mechanized infantry battalions. During alerts to the Inner German border in the Fulda Gap the Davy Crocketts accompanied their battalions. All Seventh Army's V Corps (including 3rd Armored Division) combat maneuver battalions had preassigned positions in the Fulda Gap. These were known as GDP (General Defense Plan) positions. The Davy Crockett sections were included in these defensive deployment plans. In addition to the Davy Crocketts (e.g., assigned to the 3rd Armored Division), Seventh Army's V Corps had nuclear artillery rounds and atomic demolition munitions, and these were also for potential use in the Fulda Gap. On the Korean peninsula, Eighth Army units assigned the Davy Crockett weapons primarily planned to use the passes that funneled armor as killing grounds, creating temporarily deadly radioactive zones roadblocked by destroyed tanks and other vehicles.

Production of the Davy Crockett began at Picatinny Arsenal following the August 15, 1958, approval of the design. There was approval for funding of 6,247 to be manufactured, but a total of 2,100 were actually made. The weapon was tested between 1962 and 1968 at the Pohakuloa Training Area on Hawaiʻi island, with 714 M101 spotter rounds (not live warheads) that contained depleted uranium. The weapon was deployed with US Army forces from 1961 to 1971. 

The 55th and 56th Infantry Platoons, attached to the Division Artillery of the US 82nd Airborne Division, were the last units equipped with the M-29 Davy Crockett weapons system. These two units were parachute deployed and, with a  ton truck per section (three per platoon), were fully air droppable. The units were deactivated in mid-1968.

The Davy Crockett's nuclear warhead, the M388, was removed from US Army Europe (in West Germany) in August 1967. The last nuclear-equipped warhead was retired in 1971. Brigadier General Alvin Cowan, Assistant Division Commander of 3rd Armored Division, while stating the weapon was a "significant advance" in technical terms and that the laboratory responsible deserved "a great deal of credit", further stated that the Army retired the weapon due to the personnel costs associated with it as well as apparent "great fear that some sergeant would start a nuclear war".

The Davy Crockett was never used in actual combat. Since their retirement, Davy Crockett systems have been preserved in many museums throughout the United States.

In 2005 the Army announced that it uncovered 600 pounds of depleted uranium from the training sites used for the Davy Crockett's inert rounds to be practice fired. They said that 12,405 acres of land could likely be tainted by these training days.

M388 nuclear round

Projectile, Atomic, Supercaliber 279mm XM388 for the Davy Crockett contained a W54 Mod 2 nuclear warhead.

If the time delay was greater than the time-of-flight, the weapon would hit the ground before it armed and not detonate. The time dial also had a 'safe' setting, and so acted as a second safety switch.

The M388 atomic projectile was mounted on the barrel-inserted spigot via bayonet slots. Once the propellant was discharged the spigot became the launching piston for the M388 atomic projectile: this was necessary because the fission round could not be subject to high acceleration and the spigot/piston, acting as a "pusher tube", facilitated this. In flight, four fins on the end deployed to stabilize trajectory and flight.

Practice rounds

The M390 practice round was outwardly similar to the nuclear round and was designed to be a ballistic match to it. It contained  of Composition B high explosive that was detonated by an electrical switch on impact with the ground. The practice round had a significant destructive effect in its own right and was intended to be used in combat in an emergency situation. A further type of dummy training round, the M421, was completely inert and not intended to be fired.

Launcher 

The limited firing range was due to the combination of poor aerodynamics of the "watermelon with fins" (some soldiers referred to the warhead as the "atomic watermelon") type shape and the warhead's inability to withstand being fired like a traditional artillery round. This meant that it had to be fired out of a short range recoilless rifle. 

Both weapons fired the same projectile, propelled using a separate cartridge. The smaller M28 used a  explosive cartridge to launch the warhead. The larger M29 used either a five kg or a  propellant charge, depending on the desired range. The launcher systems were muzzle loading weapons; a breechloading mechanism was unnecessary as they were intended for a very low rate of fire 

Davy Crockett launchers were either mounted on a tripod launcher transported by an M113 armored personnel carrier, or they were carried by a Jeep (the M38, and later the M-151). The Jeep was equipped with an attached launcher for the M28 or the M29, as required, whereas the Davy Crockett carried by an armored personnel carrier was set up in the field on a tripod away from the carrier. The M113 was equipped to carry up to ten nuclear rounds.

Weapons assigned to infantry units were carried in M113s, those allocated to airborne units were carried on Jeeps.

The M28 launcher was also equipped with a 20mm spotting rifle – a single-shot weapon that fired depleted uranium rounds using a high–low system. These rounds flew a similar trajectory to the nuclear projectiles and produced white smoke when they landed, helping determine range. 

The Davy Crockett was fired remotely. The M388 nuclear projectile was attached to a titanium piston by means of a bayonet mount. When fired, the piston was blown out of the tube by the detonating propellant. The piston was hollow and filled with high-pressure gas from the explosion, this pressure broke shear pins that connected the piston to the nuclear projectile, detaching it after a few meters of flight. The piston would hit the ground several hundred meters in front of the weapon while the projectile continued to the target.

The Davy Crocketts were operated by a five-man crew, the squad consisting of a Commander, Gunner, Assistant Gunner, Loader and Computer. 

The commander of the M388 could issue use and have the weapon fired in a matter of minutes.

The weapon was made from lightweight metals – the tripod was aluminum, the barrel was titanium – and it was possible to break the smaller M28 weapon into three loads that could be carried by the crew, with the other two crew carrying two radios and accessories.

Operating the M28 or M29 versions of the weapon with a three-man crew was also possible.

In the 3rd Armored Division in Germany in the 1960s many Davy Crockett Sections (all of which were in the Heavy Mortar Platoons, in Headquarters Companies of Infantry or Armor Maneuver Battalions) received what became a mix of M28 and M29 launchers (e.g., one of each per D/C section). Eventually, the M28s were replaced by M29s, so that both the armored personnel carriers and the Jeeps carried the M29.

Effects

The shell's greatest effect would have been its extreme prompt neutron radiation which would have killed most of the enemy troops inside that circle within minutes. Its blast would do very little if any damage to the enemy's tracked vehicles. Troops further away would have died within hours, days and less than two weeks depending on their range from the point of burst and the thickness of their protection.

The weapon's blast was not a danger to the crew as long as they followed normal procedures. The Army created a standard for the crew to follow when firing the M388; they advised that the soldiers shelter their bodies behind a sloped hill and lie in prone position on the ground with their necks and heads covered.

This was the last atmospheric test detonation at the Nevada Test Site. 

Information and recorded data from test-firing inert rounds showed the recoilless rifles to be "shockingly inaccurate" and led to the realization that the weapon was "too inaccurate to deliver even low-yield nuclear fires".

Spending 
Development of this weapon proved to be costly in all aspects of design, modifications, and labor. Over a 5 year period from 1958 to 1963, total expenses soared to nearly $20 million (equivalent to $ million in ). The initial allotted development costs varied from year to year, starting with $1.1 million in 1958, $9.15 million in 1959, $5 million in 1960, $2.4 million in 1961, $1.5 million in 1962, and $250,000 in 1963.

Proposed German military use 
One of the most fervent supporters of the Davy Crockett was West Germany's defense minister Franz Josef Strauss, in the late 1950s and early 1960s. Strauss promoted the idea of equipping German brigades with the nuclear weapon, to be supplied by the US, arguing that this would allow German troops to become a much more effective factor in NATO's defense of Germany against a potential Soviet invasion. He argued that a single Davy Crockett could replace 40–50 salvos of a whole divisional artillery park – allowing the funds and troops normally needed for this artillery to be invested into further troops, or not having to be spent at all. US NATO commanders strongly opposed Strauss's ideas, as they would have made the use of tactical nuclear weapons almost mandatory in case of war, further reducing the ability of NATO to defend itself without resorting to atomic weapons.

Concerns and potential problems

Radiation exposure 
The Davy Crockett Weapon System's use of depleted uranium in the spotting round led to concerns about troop exposure to the material. However, studies indicated that there was no risk of exposure to the material during use of the weapon.

As a nuclear munition, however, an exceptionally strong safety program was required. This included providing render-safe procedure documentation to explosive ordnance personnel before delivery of the first warheads.

Accuracy 
Brigadier General Alvin Cowan, Assistant Division Commander of 3rd Armored Division, while discussing the weapon's retirement commended the technical design of the weapon.

Other uses of the W54 warhead 

The W54 warhead used by the Davy Crockett was initially developed for both the Davy Crockett and the AIM-4 Falcon air-to-air missile under the designation of XW-51. However, the development of the warhead was reassigned to Los Alamos Scientific Laboratory in January 1959 and redesignated the XW-54. This produced the Mark 54 mod 0 and Mark 54 Mod 2 warheads for Falcon and Davy Crockett use respectively, which were only distinguishable by the environmental sensing device employed. Later, the Special Atomic Demolition Munition (SADM – sometimes designated the B54) was developed and saw service between 1964 and 1989. SADM was so different from the W54 warhead that consideration was given to renaming the weapon with its own unique mark number. Mod numbers between the Mark 54/W54 and B54/SADM are not shared. A later development of the W54 was the W72 warhead for the AGM-62 Walleye television-guided glide bomb system.

Museum examples

The following museums have a Davy Crockett casing in their collection:

 National Museum of the United States Army, Fort Belvoir, Fairfax County, Virginia
 Air Force Space and Missile Museum, Cape Canaveral Space Force Station, Florida
 National Museum of Nuclear Science & History, adjacent to Kirtland AFB, Albuquerque, New Mexico
 National Infantry Museum, Fort Benning, Georgia
 United States Army Ordnance Training and Heritage Center, Fort Lee, Prince George County, Virginia (closed to public)
 Watervliet Arsenal Museum, Watervliet, New York
 West Point Museum, United States Military Academy, West Point, New York
 National Atomic Testing Museum, Las Vegas, Nevada
 Don F. Pratt Memorial Museum, Fort Campbell, Clarksville, Tennessee

References

Citations

Bibliography

Further reading

Davy Crockett King of the Atomic Frontier
Title: “Project Management of the Davy Crockett Weapons System 1958 – 1962”

External links

M-28/29 Davy Crockett, the World’s Smallest Nuclear Weapon
Facts about the "Davy Crockett" launcher and warhead
Loaded and unloaded M29 Davy Crockett
and Height of Burst Switch
 D/C Launching Piston
Characteristics of all US nuclear weapons designs
DCs in 3rd Armored Division
DCs on the highway
President Kennedy questions Davy Crockett crewmen
DC Souvenirs
See John Marshall's Davy Crockett write up in the 3rd Bn, 36th Infantry section
Davy Crocketts in Southern Avenue of Fulda Gap
 Davy Crocketts during Oct 62 Cuban Crisis (Southern Avenue of Fulda Gap)-- see especially bottom of jchorazy's Page 12
Video showing testing of device on youtube.com
Operation Ivy Flats — testing of the Davy Crockett, 1962 (17:46)
Wee Gwen - a UK weapon similar to Davy Crockett

Recoilless rifles of the United States
Nuclear artillery
Cold War weapons of the United States
Nuclear weapons of the United States